Potevio Group Corporation is a Chinese telecommunications hardware manufacturing company. It was one of the 102 state-owned enterprises that is supervised by the State-owned Assets Supervision and Administration Commission of the State Council. Potevio Group Corporation is the parent company of Potevio Co., Ltd..

In 2021, it was reported that Potevio had been absorbed into China Electronics Technology Group (CETC).

Subsidiaries
Potevio Group is the parent company of 5 listed companies: Shanghai Potevio (SSE:600680), Eastern Communications (SSE:600776), Nanjing Putian Telecommunications (SZSE:200468), Chengdu Putian Telecommunication Cables (HKEX:1202) and Eastcompeace Technology (SZSE:002017).

Controversies 
As of 2015, Potevio Group's subsidiary Potevio Co., Ltd. owned 39.04% stake of Puhua Investment as the largest shareholder. Puhua Investment was infamously linked to Xiao Jianhua as part of his business empire, Tomorrow series of companies,  who brought the Pacific Securities to float in the Shanghai Stock Exchange.

Puhua Investment was a minority shareholder of another securities broker , which was part of the Tomorrow series of companies.

References

Government-owned companies of China
Manufacturing companies based in Beijing
Companies established in 1980